Poropteron multicornis is a species of sea snail, a marine gastropod mollusk in the family Muricidae, the murex snails or rock snails.

Description

Distribution
This marine species occurs off East London, South Africa

References

External links
 Houart, R. (1991). Description of four new species of Muricidae from southern Africa with range extensions and a review of the subgenus Poropteron Jousseaume, 1880 (Ocenebrinae). Apex. 6 (3-4): 59-76
 Barco, A.; Herbert, G.; Houart, R.; Fassio, G. & Oliverio, M. (2017). A molecular phylogenetic framework for the subfamily Ocenebrinae (Gastropoda, Muricidae). Zoologica Scripta. 46 (3): 322-335

Muricidae
Gastropods described in 1991